Tapati Guha-Thakurta (born 1957) is an Indian historian who has written about the cultural history and art of India. She is a director and professor in history at the Centre for Studies in Social Sciences, Calcutta, and was previously a professor at Presidency College, Kolkata. Her extensive research work on Kolkata's Durga Puja led to its inclusion in UNESCOs Intangible Cultural Heritage list.

Biography
Guha-Thakurta was born in Calcutta and obtained a bachelor's and a master's degree in history from the Presidency College and Calcutta University. She finished her DPhil. at the University of Oxford. Guha-Thakurta was married to historian Hari Vasudevan, who died in May 2020 after contracting the Covid-19 virus.

Career
In 1995, she was awarded the Charles Wallace Visiting Fellowship at Wolfson College, Cambridge. In 2011, she was a visiting fellow at the Yale Center for British Art.
In 2018, she was a visiting professor at Brown University. She has written exhibition monographs and curated many art exhibitions. In 2019, she was assigned by the Indian Ministry of Culture to prepare a dossier proposing the inclusion of Durga Puja in the UNESCO Representative List of the Intangible Cultural Heritage of Humanity.

Books

References

External links
Centre for Studies in Social Sciences – profile
Brown University – profile
University of Chicago – profile

Indian art historians
Academic staff of Presidency University, Kolkata
Indian curators
1957 births
Bengali Hindus
Bengali historians
20th-century Bengalis
21st-century Bengalis
20th-century Indian historians
21st-century Indian historians
Indian women historians
Indian scholars
Indian women scholars
20th-century Indian scholars
21st-century Indian scholars
Living people
Indian art writers
Scholars from West Bengal
Indian academics
Cultural historians
Historians of Indian art